West Bourke was an electoral district of the Legislative Assembly in the Australian state of Victoria from 1856 to 1904.

The district of West Bourke was one of the initial districts of the first Victorian Legislative Assembly, 1856.

Boundaries 
The boundaries of the district included the Great Dividing Range from the source of the Werribee River to the north-eastern branch of the Saltwater River near Big Hill, then from the Saltwater River to the south-western corner of the parish of Bulla Bulla. The eastern boundary included the source of the Moonee Ponds to Flemington Bridge, then south to the Yarra River, Port Phillip Bay and to the mouth of the Werribee River at its source in the Great Dividing Range.

Members for West Bourke
Two members initially, three from the expansion of 1859. Fewer members after the redistributions of 1877 and 1889.

References

Former electoral districts of Victoria (Australia)
1856 establishments in Australia
1904 disestablishments in Australia